Janumadatha is a 1999 Indian Kannada-language film,  directed by  T. S. Nagabharana and produced by K. Musthafa. The film stars Shiva Rajkumar, Anju Aravind, Sarath Babu and Ambika. The film's musical score was by V. Manohar. The film is based on the Oscar Award winning Dutch film Character (1997).

Cast

Soundtrack

The Music Was Composed By V. Manohar and Released by Akash Audio.

Reception
Deccan Herald wrote "Nagahharana has come up with a sensitive film though it fails to create an impact."

References

1999 films
1990s Kannada-language films
Films directed by T. S. Nagabharana
Films scored by V. Manohar